Golden Boy (stylized as GOLDEN BOY) is a Japanese sex comedy manga series written and illustrated by Tatsuya Egawa. It was serialized in Shueisha's seinen manga magazine Super Jump from 1992 to 1997, with its chapters collected in ten tankōbon volumes. It tells the story of Kintaro Oe, a 25-year-old freeter "travelling student", who despite having met the requirements for a law degree, left Tokyo University without graduating. Kintaro is living freely, roaming Japan from town to town, job to job. During his travels, Kintaro meets several women whose lives he dramatically changes, despite poor first impressions. He constantly observes and studies the people and events around him, recording his findings in a notebook he carries on his belt.

Parts of the manga were adapted into a six-episode original video animation (OVA) series produced by Shueisha and KSS in 1995. In North America, it was first licensed by ADV Films in 1996. ADV's license to the series expired in 2007 and was later acquired by Media Blasters. Media Blasters lost the license in 2012 and it was later acquired by Discotek Media. A sequel to the manga, Golden Boy II, was serialized in Business Jump from September 2010 to May 2011.

Plot
The beginning of each volume and episode of Golden Boy places Kintaro opposite a young, beautiful woman, whose interest or disdain for him serves as the basis of the plot. Some of these women initially dismiss Kintaro as an idiotic and clumsy pervert, and either give him or accept from him some challenge to prove their superiority. Kintaro invariably lusts after these women, and satiates his voyeurism, while he is fulfilling his desire to be of actual service to these women.

As he meets their needs, he continues to learn more about the world professionally and personally. Despite his outward appearances, Kintaro is an incredibly clever and resourceful individual, and consistently exceeds the expectations of the women he encounters. In the end he wins their hearts despite his outward awkwardness. But due to chance, necessity or a sense of honor, Kintaro never takes advantage of these newfound feelings. As the manga series progresses it introduces fewer women over multiple chapter arcs, such as a shoplifting schoolgirl, and goes back to women from earlier in the series that he has affected.

Kintaro is a freeter, and has done various jobs as he quests around Japan in pursuit of knowledge. His ventures include computer programming, housekeeping, teaching, the culinary arts, and most of all, studying. Kintaro is also often seen demonstrating the skills he has learned in previous chapters to overcome challenges faced in the current one. He is also adept in martial arts, but does not fight unless he is angered, and ordinarily just takes a beating. Much of the humor derives from situational elements, such as encounters between Kintaro and the women gone awry, and interactions between Kintaro's libido and imagination. Recurring gags include Kintaro's fetish for toilets (especially those recently used by beautiful women), his exaggerated facial expressions, and comical entries in his notebook. The notebook entries include explicit drawings of the women he encounters and bits of wisdom such as "'C' base is not sex", and "The human head cannot turn 360 degrees." Regarding the series, Tatsuya Egawa writes: "Before leaving kindergarten, I wrote these words in my notebook: 'I really like to study.' Often I wonder when it was that our schools forgot the true meaning of 'study', something which is now so often misunderstood by teachers and parents. Learning ought to be both stimulating and entertaining".

Characters

Media

Manga
Written and illustrated by Tatsuya Egawa, Golden Boy was serialized in Shueisha's seinen manga magazine Super Jump from 1992 to 1997. Shueisha collected its chapters in ten tankōbon volumes, released from June 4, 1993, to January 9, 1998.

A sequel to the manga, was serialized in Business Jump from September 15, 2010, to May 18, 2011. Shueisha collected its chapters in two tankōbon volumes, released on February 18 and July 19, 2011.

Volume list

OVA
Adapted by Shueisha and KSS into an original video animation (OVA) series, Golden Boy was first released in Japan on VHS and later on laserdisc. Kintaro is voiced by Mitsuo Iwata (and Doug Smith in English). The closing theme is "Study A Go! Go!" by Golden Girls. The series was licensed in North America by ADV Films and was released on VHS in both subtitled and dubbed editions, later releasing on two DVD volumes on April 23 and June 18, 2002, and a complete series release on May 25, 2004. The license was later transferred to Media Blasters for a DVD release on November 6, 2007, and then Discotek Media for a DVD release on November 6, 2012.

Episode list

Reception
The Golden Boy OVA was generally well received by English-language reviewers. It is widely known for its mature content: while the OVA is not strictly a hentai animation, it does feature instances of partial female nudity, orgasms, and female masturbation. In contrast, the manga becomes almost pornographic starting in the second volume. Jeff Ulmer of DigitallyObsessed calls it "hilarious", and Luis Cruz of AnimeOnDVD says it is "surprisingly well-written for an erotic comedy," and that it "easily deserves the 'Essential' moniker bestowed upon it" by ADV. Cruz goes on to say that the series' jokes "feel like a natural extension of both the characters and the plot...". Mike Toole of AnimeJump says “the mixture of realistic storytelling with Kintaro's deranged personality is always a hoot to watch.” Of Kintaro himself, Toole says he "has a simple everyman appeal", and Cruz contends that Kintaro's "charming character" is what makes the anime coherent. Toole says that Golden Boy "is worthwhile for the final episode alone...", and Ulmer feels that it "took the cake". Golden Boy popularized anime in Russia after being a huge success on its MTV Russia.

References

External links
 

1992 manga
1995 anime OVAs
ADV Films
Discotek Media
Production I.G
Seinen manga
Sex comedy anime and manga
Shueisha franchises
Shueisha manga
Tatsuya Egawa